Bandakpur railway station is a railway station in Bandakpur town of Madhya Pradesh. Its code is BNU. It serves Bandakpur town. The station consists of two platforms. Passenger, Express and Superfast trains halt here.

References

Railway stations in Damoh district
Jabalpur railway division